Hartmannella is a genus of Amoebozoa.

Species

 Hartmannella agricola Goodey 1916
 Hartmannella aquara Jollos 1917
 Hartmannella biparia Richards 1968
 ?Hartmannella castellanii 
 ?Hartmannella crumpae Singh & Hanumaiah 1979
 ?Hartmannella diploidea 
 Hartmannella exudans Page 1967
 Hartmannella fecalis Walker 1908
 Hartmannella fluvialis Dobell 1914
 ?Hartmannella horticola (Nägler 1909)
 Hartmannella hyalina (Dangeard 1900) Aléxéieff 1912
 ?Hartmannella indicans 
 Hartmannella klitzkei Arndt 1924
 Hartmannella lamellipodia Glaeser 1912
 Hartmannella leptochema Singh 1951
 ?Hartmannella limax 
 Hartmannella lobifera Smirnov 1997
 ?Hartmannella motonucleata Lepşi 1960
 ?Hartmannella quadriparia Richards 1968
 ?Hartmannella tahitiensis Cheng 1970
 ?Hartmannella testudinis Ivanic 1926
 Hartmannella vacuolata Anderson, Rogerson & Hannah 1997

Hartmannella vermiformis is, however, not closely related to the other members of the genus and has been renamed as Vermamoeba vermiformis.

References

Amoebozoa genera